Amy R. Reibman is an American electrical engineer known for her work on video quality, transport, and analysis. She is a professor of electrical and computer engineering at Purdue University.

Education and career
Reibman's parents were an engineer and a computer programmer, and she became interested in computing while still in elementary school. After starting her undergraduate education in mechanical engineering at a different university, she became an electrical engineering student at Duke University, where she earned a bachelor's degree in 1983, master's degree in 1984, and Ph.D. in 1987.

After joining the Princeton University faculty as an assistant professor, she moved to AT&T Labs Research. She worked at AT&T for 23 years, and was named a Distinguished Member of the Technical Staff and Lead Inventive Scientist there, before returning to academia as a professor at Purdue.

Recognition
Reibman was named a Fellow of the IEEE in 2005, "for contributions to the transport of video over networks".
Reibman was elected to fellow status of the National Academy of Inventors in December, 2022.

References

External links
Home page

Year of birth missing (living people)
Living people
American electrical engineers
American women engineers
Duke University alumni
Princeton University faculty
Scientists at Bell Labs
Purdue University faculty
Fellow Members of the IEEE
21st-century American women